The 2019–20 Liga IV Bacău was the 52nd season of Liga IV Bacău, the fourth tier of the Romanian football league system. The season is scheduled began on 24 August 2019 and was scheduled to end in June 2020, but was suspended in March because of the COVID-19 pandemic in Romania. 

The season was ended officially on 26 July 2020 after a championship play-off match between the teams in first place in the Bacău and Valea Trotușului Series. Viitorul Curița win the title and qualify to promotion play-off in Liga III.

Team changes

To Liga IV Bacău
Relegated from Liga III
 —

From Liga IV Bacău
Promoted to Liga III
 CSM Bacău

Competition format
The league consisted of 24 teams divided into 2 series of 12 teams and will play a regular season, followed by a play-off and play-out. The regular season is a double round-robin tournament. At the end of regular season, the first 3 ranked teams in each series will qualify for championship play-off and the winner will participate for promotion play-off to Liga III. Teams ranked 4 to 10 from each series will participate in the play-out and the last four will relegated. Teams ranked 11-12 at the end the regular season in each series will relegated to Liga V.

In the play-off will participate only teams that have legal personality and hold C.I.S.(Certificate of sports identity) issued by the Ministry of Youth and Sport and teams with at least one group of children and juniors (U19, U17, U15, U13, U11).

League tables

Bacău Series

Valea Trotușului Series

Championship play-off

|}

Viitorul Curița won the 2019–20 Liga IV Bacău  and qualify for promotion play-off.''

Promotion play-off

Champions of Liga IV – Bacău County face champions of Liga IV – Botoșani County and Liga IV – Vaslui County.

Region 1 (North–East)

Group B

See also

Main Leagues
 2019–20 Liga I
 2019–20 Liga II
 2019–20 Liga III
 2019–20 Liga IV

County Leagues (Liga IV series)

 2019–20 Liga IV Alba
 2019–20 Liga IV Arad
 2019–20 Liga IV Argeș
 2019–20 Liga IV Bihor
 2019–20 Liga IV Bistrița-Năsăud
 2019–20 Liga IV Botoșani
 2019–20 Liga IV Brăila
 2019–20 Liga IV Brașov
 2019–20 Liga IV Bucharest
 2019–20 Liga IV Buzău
 2019–20 Liga IV Călărași
 2019–20 Liga IV Caraș-Severin
 2019–20 Liga IV Cluj
 2019–20 Liga IV Constanța
 2019–20 Liga IV Covasna
 2019–20 Liga IV Dâmbovița
 2019–20 Liga IV Dolj
 2019–20 Liga IV Galați 
 2019–20 Liga IV Giurgiu
 2019–20 Liga IV Gorj
 2019–20 Liga IV Harghita
 2019–20 Liga IV Hunedoara
 2019–20 Liga IV Ialomița
 2019–20 Liga IV Iași
 2019–20 Liga IV Ilfov
 2019–20 Liga IV Maramureș
 2019–20 Liga IV Mehedinți
 2019–20 Liga IV Mureș
 2019–20 Liga IV Neamț
 2019–20 Liga IV Olt
 2019–20 Liga IV Prahova
 2019–20 Liga IV Sălaj
 2019–20 Liga IV Satu Mare
 2019–20 Liga IV Sibiu
 2019–20 Liga IV Suceava
 2019–20 Liga IV Teleorman
 2019–20 Liga IV Timiș
 2019–20 Liga IV Tulcea
 2019–20 Liga IV Vâlcea
 2019–20 Liga IV Vaslui
 2019–20 Liga IV Vrancea

References

External links
 Official website 

Liga IV seasons
Sport in Bacău County